Charles Larson may refer to:

Charles R. Larson (1936–2014), U.S. Navy admiral and candidate for Lt. Governor of Maryland
Charles R. Larson (scholar) (1938–2021), American scholar of African literature
Charles Larson (producer) (1922–2006), television producer
Chuck Larson (born 1968), former Iowa state senator
Chuck Larson, co-founder of Rock River Arms